The rufous hawk-cuckoo or northern hawk-cuckoo (Hierococcyx hyperythrus) is a bird in the family Cuculidae formerly thought to be conspecific with Hodgson's hawk-cuckoo (Hierococcyx fugax) and placed in the genus Cuculus.

Geographic Range
Hierococcyx hyperythrus is found in eastern China, North and South Korea, far eastern Russia,  and Japan. Northern populations winter in Borneo.

References

rufous hawk-cuckoo
Birds of East Asia
rufous hawk-cuckoo